Kieran Michael O'Hara (born 22 April 1996) is a professional footballer who plays as a goalkeeper for Colchester United. Born in England, he represents the Republic of Ireland national team at international level.

Club career

Urmston Town
Born in Manchester, O'Hara began his career with local club Urmston Town, while attending Ashton-on-Mersey School and Sixth Form.

Manchester United
He then joined Manchester United on 1 July 2012, having represented the club at the Future Cup earlier in the year. Reaching the final before losing to Ajax on penalties, the goalkeeper signed on to become an Under-17 Academy student, working with Under-18 coach Paul McGuinness.

Loan moves
His chances were limited in his first season with the youth team, and he was soon given a work-experience loan with Trafford throughout the 2013–14 season. Upon his return, and having faced his first taste of senior football, O'Hara was promoted to the Under-21 squad.

Despite his continued difficulty in breaking into the starting XI, with Joel Castro Pereira the preferred goalkeeper, O'Hara signed a professional deal with the Reds in the summer of 2014.

Making a single appearance for the Under-21s, he soon faced further loan spells in a bid to impress the coaching staff at Old Trafford. After a one-month loan with Conference North title-contenders AFC Fylde, O'Hara was given his first opportunity for United in the final game of the Under-21 Premier League season. Following 15 games as an unused substitute, he completed 90 minutes in a 3–1 defeat to Manchester City, with his side already crowned league champions.

O'Hara opted for senior football once more during the 2015–16 season, and completed a deadline day move to League Two club Morecambe on a one-month loan in the summer. He later faced a one-month loan spell with National League North club Stockport County in November, before returning to Morecambe for the remainder of the season on 12 January.

Having failed to make a competitive appearance in his first spell with the Shrimps, O'Hara made his professional debut in a 3–1 defeat to league leaders Northampton Town on 23 January 2016.

On 15 August 2018, O'Hara joined League Two side Macclesfield Town on loan for the 2018–19 season. O'Hara was Macclesfield's first-choice goalkeeper for the 2018–19 season, making 37 appearances in the league, as well as a further five in cup competitions, including Macclesfield's 8–0 loss to West Ham United in the third round of the EFL Cup. A draw with Cambridge United saw Macclesfield remain in the Football League, helped greatly by O'Hara's performances in goal; his form over the course of the season saw him named as Macclesfield's Player of the Year, Players' Player of the Year and Young Player of the Year.

For the 2019–20 season, O'Hara joined League One side Burton Albion on loan.

Upon his return to Manchester United, he was released by the club on 30 June 2020.

Burton Albion
On 11 September 2020, O'Hara signed with Burton Albion for a two-year deal.

On 20 November 2021, O'Hara joined League Two side Scunthorpe United on an emergency seven-day loan deal following an injury to first-team goalkeeper Rory Watson. On 26 November 2021, the loan was extended by a further seven days.

Fleetwood Town
On 1 February 2022, O'Hara joined fellow League One side Fleetwood Town after leaving Burton Albion by mutual consent. O'Hara was released by the club at the end of the season.

Colchester United
After leaving Fleetwood Town, O'Hara signed a one year deal with League Two side Colchester United.

Career statistics

Club

International

International career 
O'Hara qualifies to play for the Republic of Ireland through his paternal grandparents, who are from Galway.

He was called up by the Irish senior national team in March 2019. He made his senior international debut on 10 September 2019, coming on for another debutant Mark Travers in a 3–1 win over Bulgaria at the Aviva Stadium. He made his full debut against New Zealand starting in a friendly on 14 November 2019.

References 

1996 births
Living people
People from Urmston
Republic of Ireland association footballers
Republic of Ireland youth international footballers
English footballers
English people of Irish descent
Association football goalkeepers
English Football League players
Trafford F.C. players
Manchester United F.C. players
AFC Fylde players
Stockport County F.C. players
Morecambe F.C. players
Macclesfield Town F.C. players
Burton Albion F.C. players
Scunthorpe United F.C. players
Fleetwood Town F.C. players
Colchester United F.C. players
Republic of Ireland international footballers